John Coker (28 July 1821 – 30 July 1901) was an English first-class cricketer and clergyman.

The son of Thomas Lewis Coker, he was born at Cheltenham in July 1821. He was educated at Winchester College, before going up to New College, Oxford. While studying at Oxford he played first-class cricket for Oxford University, making his debut against the Marylebone Cricket Club at Oxford in 1840. He played first-class cricket for Oxford until 1844, making eleven appearances. He scored a total of 136 runs at an average of 6.80, with a high score of 27. After graduating from Oxford, Coker took holy orders in the Church of England. He was the rector of Tingewick in Buckinghamshire for 46 years, until his death there in July 1901.

References

External links

1821 births
1901 deaths
sportspeople from Cheltenham
People educated at Winchester College
Alumni of New College, Oxford
English cricketers
Oxford University cricketers
19th-century English Anglican priests
20th-century English Anglican priests